Run for the Roses is the fourth and final solo album by Jerry Garcia.

Track listing
"Run for the Roses" (Jerry Garcia, Robert Hunter)
"I Saw Her Standing There" (John Lennon, Paul McCartney)
"Without Love" (Dany Small)
"Midnight Getaway" (Jerry Garcia, John Kahn, Robert Hunter)
"Leave The Little Girl Alone" (John Kahn, Robert Hunter)
"Valerie" (Jerry Garcia, Robert Hunter)
"Knockin' on Heaven's Door" (Bob Dylan)
The album was reissued in the All Good Things: Jerry Garcia Studio Sessions box set with the following bonus tracks:
"Fennario" (Traditional) (aka Peggy-O)
"Alabama Getaway" (Jerry Garcia, Robert Hunter)
"Tangled Up in Blue" (Bob Dylan)
"Simple Twist of Fate" (Bob Dylan)
"Dear Prudence" (John Lennon, Paul McCartney)
"Valerie" alternative mix (Jerry Garcia, Robert Hunter)

Personnel

Musicians
Jerry Garcia – guitar, vocals
John Kahn – bass, fretless bass, synthesizer, piano, clavinet, guitar
Ron Tutt – drums, percussion
Melvin Seals – organ
Merl Saunders – organ
James Warren – piano, clavinet
Michael O'Martian – piano, clavinet
Michael Neuman – trumpet
Liz Stires – vocals
Julie Stafford – vocals

Production
Produced by Jerry Garcia, John Kahn
Recording: Betty Cantor-Jackson, Ron Malo
Mixing: Bob Matthews
Mastering: George Horn
Artwork: Victor Moscoso

References

Jerry Garcia albums
1982 albums
Arista Records albums